Labyrinth of Dreams, released in 1992, is the debut album by Dutch power metal band Elegy. It reached number 42 on the album charts in Japan.

Track listing 
"The Grand Change" - 4:42
"I'm No Fool" - 4:56
"Take My Love" - 4:47
"All Systems Go" (instrumental) - 2:56
"Trouble in Paradise" - 5:36
"Over and Out" - 3:42
"Labyrinth of Dreams" - 6:10
"Mass Hysteria" (instrumental) - 1:25	
"Powergames" - 4:25
"The Guiding Light" - 3:15

Bonus Tracks (2009 re-release) 
"The Guiding Light" (demo)
"Ballad" (demo, instrumental)
"I'm No Fool" (video)

Contributing members 
Eduard Hovinga - vocals
Henk van de Laars - guitars
Arno Van Brussel - guitars
Martin Helmantel - bass
Ton van de Stroom - keyboards
Ed Warby - drums

References

External links
 Encyclopaedia Metallum entry

1992 debut albums
Elegy (band) albums
Noise Records albums